Macedon railway station is located on the Deniliquin line in Victoria, Australia. It serves the town of Macedon, and it opened on 8 July 1861 as Middle Gully. It was renamed Macedon on 1 April 1870.

Sidings and a crossover once existed at the station. By 1984, they were abolished. In 1994, the Victoria Street level crossing, which was located at the Down end of the station, was closed to road traffic except for emergency access vehicles. It was closed altogether in 1995.

In March 2014, the platforms were extended to accommodate longer trains.

Platforms and services

Macedon has two side platforms. Before 9am, trains to Melbourne depart from Platform 2, and trains to Bendigo depart from Platform 1, with this arrangement reversing after 9am. This is to allow services in the peak direction of travel to use the single 160 km/h track that was upgraded in 2006, as part of the Regional Fast Rail project.

It is serviced by V/Line Bendigo and Echuca line services.

Platform 1:
 services to Kyneton, Bendigo, Epsom, Eaglehawk and Southern Cross
 services to Echuca and Southern Cross

Platform 2:
 services to Kyneton, Bendigo, Epsom, Eaglehawk and Southern Cross
 services to Echuca and Southern Cross

References

External links
Victorian Railway Stations gallery
Melway map at street-directory.com.au

Regional railway stations in Victoria (Australia)